Eduardo Espinoza Ramos (born 3 March 1946) is a Peruvian politician and Mathematician. He is a former Congressman representing Cajamarca for the period 2006–2011, and belongs to the Union for Peru party.

References

Living people
Members of the Congress of the Republic of Peru

1946 births
Peruvians for Change politicians
Union for Peru politicians
Alliance for Progress (Peru) politicians
Place of birth missing (living people)
National University of Cajamarca alumni